The Gendarmery is the national gendarmerie force of the Republic of Serbia. It is under the authority of the Police Directorate of the Serbian Ministry of Interior and was formed on 28 June 2001, after the disbandment of the Special Police Units (PJP). Gendarmery in Serbia existed in previous form from 1860 to 1920. As a special unit inside Serbian police, its role can be compared to those of Russian OMON and former Ukrainian Berkut units.

As of 2017, Gendarmery consists of about 2,800 members. The Command of the Gendarmery is in Belgrade.

The gendarmery's duties are both civilian and military, including securing the 'Ground Safety Zone' along the administrative line with Kosovo and providing disaster rescue teams (see below).

History 

The word žandarmerija is a French loanword ("gendarmerie"), and is pronounced "zhandarmeriya". The Žandarmerija corps date back to the Principality of Serbia, established on June 28, 1860, and originally consisted of 120 officers. It was an important police special unit both in Kingdom of Serbia and in the Kingdom of Yugoslavia. However, it was abandoned after World War II and was restored in 2001 by the reorganization of the irregular "Special Police Unit" (PJP). This was accomplished by an act issued by the Interior Minister Dušan Mihajlović. One of its first major assignments was capturing the suspects in the assassination of Prime Minister Zoran Đinđić.

On 7 May 2003, the Counter-Terrorist Unit (CTU) was established within Gendarmery, but was separated in April 2007 to become an independent unit within the Police.

In 2005 the Person and Infrastructure Protection Unit was established, to carry out close protection tasks, as well as activities related to technical protection.

In 2011 the Gendarmery was reorganized and the First Quick Response Detachment was established, consisting of the specialist companies of all Gendarmery detachments along with the Diving Center.

Commanders 
Since its establishment, the Serbian Gendarmery has had six Commanders:

Organization 

In 2012, the Serbian Gendarmery consisted of about 3,734 members, while in 2017 the strength is estimated at 2,800 members.

Alongside the operational detachments deployed through Serbia, the Gendarmery has some specialized units: the Diving Unit and the Personnel and Infrastructure Protection Unit, which is specialized in tasks of physical and technical protection.

Detachments 
The principal bases are located in Belgrade, Niš, Novi Sad and Kraljevo.

Detachments are organized as independent units in order to be able to execute every-day duties on their territory of jurisdiction. Should the need arise, each detachment may quickly support others throughout Serbia.

First Quick Detachment
Within each operational detachment, a company-sized specialized unit is tasked to deal with most complex tasks in both urban and rural environment. In turn, each specialized unit consists of several counter-terrorist teams, which may be reinforced by sniper, K9 and explosive ordnance disposal assets when needed. Since 2011, specialized units are grouped within the First Quick Detachment. The first commander was Police Lieutenant Colonel Vojkan Ivanovic.

Diving Unit 
The Diving Unit of the Serbian Gendarmery is headquartered in Belgrade and is intended for conducting special actions in environments dominated by water, as well as the land area near water. Its operational element consists of three specialist teams: intervention team, searching team and nautical team.

The Diving Unit tracks its origins to 1997, when it was established within the Special Operation Unit.

Mission 

Its main duties are:
 Restoring peace and stability if they have been heavily disturbed
 Counter terrorism
 Countering violent groups
 Repressing prison riots
Its civil duties include: to provide security and public peace, to investigate and prevent organized crime, terrorism and other violent groups; to protect state and private property; to help and assist civilians and other emergency forces in a case of emergency, natural disaster, civil unrest and armed conflicts.

Its military duties include to provide, preserve and protect security and public peace, public order, to protect state and private property, to assist other security forces in case of emergency, civil unrest, war; to repress riots; to reinforce martial law and mobilization; to fight and apprehend suspected criminals, terrorists and other violent groups ;

Its additional duties are to perform any duties decreed in the decrees of law and regulations other than civil, military and other duties and the duties given by the governmental decrees based on them.

Equipment 
Firearms

Vehicles

See also
 Police of Serbia

References

External links

 Official Žandarmerija of the Ministry of Internal Affairs
 Short video about Žandarmerija
 "Nadležnosti" [Duties]. Ministry of the Interior, Republic of Serbia 

Serbian Gendarmerie
1860 establishments in Serbia
1940s disestablishments in Serbia
2001 establishments in Serbia
Articles containing video clips
Specialist law enforcement agencies of Serbia
Serbia